League tables for teams participating in Kolmonen, the fourth tier of the Finnish soccer league system, in 2006.

League Tables 2006

Helsinki and Uusimaa

Section 1

Section 2

Section 3

South-East Finland (Kaakkois-Suomi)

Central Finland (Keski-Suomi)

Relegation playoff

Huima II withdrew, HPP promoted.

Eastern Finland (Itä-Suomi)

NB: Zulimanit and SiPS withdrew from Promotion Playoff and Riverball took their place.

Northern Finland (Pohjois-Suomi)

Central Ostrobothnia (Keski-Pohjanmaa)

Preliminary stage

Relegation playoff Group
(preliminary stage points included)

Relegation playoff

First Leg 
FC YPA II     3-0 PeFF

Second Leg 
PeFF          3-2 FC YPA II

FC YPA II promoted, PeFF relegated.

Vaasa

Preliminary stage

Relegation playoff Group
(preliminary stage points included)

Vaasa/Central Ostrobothnia Promotion Playoff Group

NB: Öja-73 withdrew from Promotion Playoff and Norrvalla FF took their place.

Satakunta

Tampere

Relegation playoff

Härmä promoted, FC Vapsi relegated.

Turku and Åland (Turku and Ahvenanmaa)

Promotion Playoff

Promotion Playoff Group A, South
Round 1 
PuiU          1-1 LoPa
IFFK          2-1 City Stars

Round 2 
LoPa          1-4 IFFK
City Stars    2-0 PuiU

Round 3 
PuiU          5-1 IFFK
City Stars    2-0 LoPa

Final Table:

Promotion Playoff Group B, West
Round 1 
KOO-VEE       2-2 Norrvalla FF
MuSa          0-0 KPV II

Round 2 
Norrvalla FF  2-1 MuSa
KPV II        0-0 KOO-VEE

Round 3 
KOO-VEE       0-3 MuSa
KPV II        0-0 Norrvalla FF

Final Table:

Promotion Playoff Group C, East
Round 1
FCJ Blackbird 1-2 MiKi
Riverball     0-2 KajHa

Round 2 
MiKi          3-1 Riverball
KajHa         2-2 FCJ Blackbird

Round 3 
MiKi          0-2 KajHa
FCJ Blackbird 2-0 Riverball

Final Table:

Fourth-placed teams

NB: KOO-VEE promoted as the best fourth-placed team.

Footnotes

References and sources
Finnish FA
ResultCode
Kolmonen (jalkapallo) 

Kolmonen seasons
4
Finland
Finland